Alejandro Navarro (born 30 November 1993) is a Mexican footballer who plays as a defensive midfielder for Liga MX squad Deportivo Toluca.

Club career

Early career 
On 13 August 2014, Navarro made his official debut for Toluca. He also has played for the u-17 and u-20 squads.

References

1993 births
Living people
Mexican footballers
Footballers from Guadalajara, Jalisco
Association football midfielders
Deportivo Toluca F.C. players